The 2015 West Virginia Mountaineers football team represented West Virginia University in the 2015 NCAA Division I FBS football season. Playing as a member of the Big 12 Conference (Big 12), the team was led by head coach Dana Holgorsen, in his fifth year. West Virginia played its home games at Mountaineer Field at Milan Puskar Stadium in Morgantown, West Virginia. They finished the season 8–5, 4–5 in Big 12 play to finish in a three way tie for fifth place. They were invited to the Cactus Bowl where they defeated Arizona State

Previous season
The 2014 West Virginia Mountaineers football team finished the regular season 7–5, with a highlight win against rank #4 Baylor, 41–27. The Mountaineers made it all the way to #20 in the College Football Playoff Rankings. The Mountaineers were invited to play in the Liberty Bowl against the Texas A&M of the Southeastern Conference. West Virginia lost against the Texas A&M Aggies in Memphis, Tennessee by a score of 37–45.

Schedule
West Virginia announced their 2015 football schedule on November 19, 2014. The 2015 schedule consist of 7 home and 5 away games in the regular season. The Mountaineers will host Big 12 foes Iowa State, Oklahoma State, Texas, and Texas Tech. West Virginia will travel to Baylor, Kansas, Kansas State, Oklahoma, and TCU.

The Mountaineers hosted all three non conference games against Georgia Southern, Liberty and also hosted rival Maryland.

Schedule Source:

Game summaries

Georgia Southern

Liberty

Maryland

Oklahoma

Oklahoma State

Baylor

TCU

Texas Tech

Texas

Kansas

Iowa State

Kansas State

Arizona State–Cactus Bowl

Rankings

References

West Virginia
West Virginia Mountaineers football seasons
Guaranteed Rate Bowl champion seasons
West Virginia Mountaineers football